Urapteritra falcifera is a moth of the family Uraniidae first described by Weymer in 1892. It is found in eastern Africa and South Africa .

The length of its body is 12 mm, length of its forewings 23 mm. The forewings are white with three brownish-yellow stripes.

References

Uraniidae
Moths described in 1892
Moths of Africa